Localiza is a Brazilian car rental company founded in 1973 in Belo Horizonte and is the biggest car rental in Latin America and one of the largest in the world by size of the fleet and market capitalization.

Localiza has a network consisting of 584 car rental branches in Brazil and in other eight countries, 286 of which are owned directly and 158 of which are franchised in Brazil, in 406 cities around the country. being 70 branches are franchised abroad in 44 cities in Argentina, Chile, Colombia, Ecuador, Paraguay and Uruguay.

In addition to the rental car company also operates in the business of leasing and fleet management, and grant franchises for the sale of used cars from its fleet to renew the order process (these businesses are complementary and mutually reinforcing).

Currently the company has more than 270.000 cars from brands like Volkswagen, Fiat, Renault and Chevrolet, and other nine automotive companies. Localiza competes with Movida, Locamerica-Unidas and other car rental companies.

References

Car rental companies of Brazil
Companies based in Minas Gerais
Companies listed on B3 (stock exchange)
Brazilian brands
Retail companies established in 1973
Transport companies established in 1973
1973 establishments in Brazil